Space Pioneer, also known as Beijing Tianbing Technology Co., Ltd., is a Chinese aerospace company developing reusable orbital rocket technology—both launch vehicles and liquid rocket engines—to access the market for low-cost space launch services. The company is aiming to meet launch requirements for both the Chinese national satellite internet project and also the CNSA solicitation for resupply of the Tiangong space station.

The stated mission of Space Pioneer is to "pursue new breakthroughs in technology and performance, [and] to select a technological path based on the needs of the commercial market to improve launch efficiency and reduce launch costs."

History 
Space Pioneer was founded in 2015 by Kang Yonglai

The company completed two funding rounds in 2019, including a ZJU Joint Innovation investment, to continue liquid bipropellant engine development of the Tianhou series of rocket engines.

In April 2020, the company raised  in order to complete development of its  liquid rocket engine Tianhuo-3, which had begun igniter hot fire tests in 2019.  This was followed in September with a "multiple hundreds of millions of yuan" Series A capital raise.

The company secured  venture capital funding in a pre-B funding round in July 2021. The funds will be used to complete initial development of the Tianlong-1 reusable launch vehicle, a kerolox-propellant vehicle with a payload capacity to orbit exceeding , during 2021–22.

Technology 
Space Pioneer is developing reusable spaceflight technology rather than the traditional expendable rocket technology developed by the national governments of every spacefaring nation prior to the 2010s, including China. Both launch vehicles and liquid rocket engines are being designed for reuse.

Rockets 
Tianlong-1 is a kerosene-liquid oxygen (kerolox) fueled vehicle using the Tianhuo-3 engine, with a payload capacity to low Earth orbit exceeding . 

Tianlong-2, another launch vehicle designed by the company, will enter service in early 2023. It is 32.8m tall, and it can lift up to 2t to LEO and 1.5t to 500km SSO.

Engines 
Tianhuo-1
Tianhuo-1 (TH-1) was the initial Space Pioneer rocket engine, with hot-fire ground testing completed before 2020.

Tianhuo-2
Tianhuo-2 (TH-2) was developed subsequent to Tianhuo-1, with the first hot fire test of the engine was in early 2020.

Tianhuo-3
It is intended to be the main engine for the Tianlong-1 launch vehicle. The engine had its first hot-fire test in December 2020, with a 50-second duration ground test run.

See also 

 i-Space, a competitive Chinese private launch company using solid rocket engine technology
 OneSpace, a Chinese company competitor

References 

Aerospace companies of China
Chinese companies established in 2015
Commercial launch service providers
Private spaceflight companies